Livezile (until 1960 Cacova;) is a commune located in Alba County, Transylvania, Romania. It is composed of four villages: Izvoarele (Bedellő), Livezile, Poiana Aiudului (Nyírmező), and Vălișoara (Torockógyertyános).

The commune is situated in the northern foothills of the Trascău Mountains, in the Apuseni mountain range. It lies on the banks of the Aiud River; its tributaries, the rivers Inzel and Rachiș, flow through Poiana Aiudului.

It is crossed by county road DJ107M, which connects Aiud to Iara, in Cluj County. 

The road passes through the nearby  (Cheile Vălișoarei, or Cheile Aiudului), which belong to the administrative territory of the commune. The walls of the gorges house 27 small caves with shallow karst shapes: lapis lazuli, vaults, and arches, the largest one being . The caves are home to rare species of invertebrates and bats.

References

External links
  

Communes in Alba County
Localities in Transylvania